A leukocidin is a type of cytotoxin created by some types of bacteria (Staphylococcus). It is a type of pore-forming toxin. The model for pore formation is step-wise. First, the cytotoxin’s “S” subunit recognizes specific protein-containing receptors, or an integrin on the host cell’s surface. The S subunit then recruits a second, “F” subunit, and the two subunits dimerize on the surface of the host’s cell. After dimerization, oligomerization occurs. Finally, the oligomers, consisting of alternating S and F subunits, undergo a significant structural change and form a beta-barrel, that pierces through the host cell’s lipid bilayer.

Leukocidins get their names by killing ("-cide") leukocytes. Leukocidins target phagocytes, natural killer cells, dendritic cells, and T lymphocytes and therefore targets both, innate and adaptive immune responses. Leukocidins fall into the category of bacterial invasin. Invasins are enzymatic secretions that help bacteria invade the host tissue to which they are attached. Although similar to exotoxins, invasins are different in two respects: they work through much less specific mechanisms than exotoxins, and their actions are generally more localized.

One type is Panton-Valentine leukocidin.

References

External links
 

Bacterial toxins